Tazeh Kand-e Sarand (also Romanized as Tāzeh Kand-e Sarand and Tāzeh Kand Sarand; also known as Tazakend, Tāzeh Kand, and Tāzeh Kandī) is a village in Mavazekhan-e Shomali Rural District, Khvajeh District, Heris County, East Azerbaijan Province, Iran. As of the 2006 census, its population was 225, in 50 families.

References 

Populated places in Heris County